John Leo Blair (1888–1962) was an American businessman.  He was the founder of New Process Company, now known simply as Blair Corporation – a direct market retail company.  He was also an author, inventor, a pioneer in direct marketing, and an advisor to President Franklin D. Roosevelt, and to Treasury Secretary, Henry Morgenthau, Jr. Several letters and notes exist in company archives, including a letter from Franklin D. Roosevelt, a few from Henry Morgenthau, Jr., and others from Charles Merrill of Merrill & Lynch, Supreme Court Justice Robert H. Jackson (one of Blair's very close friends) and others to support this entry.

Blair was very successful at a relatively young age. He traveled all over the world before the days of airliners. He met Popes Pius XI and Pius XII and was a long-time friend of Cardinal Francis Spellman. Blair contributed significantly to the healing of the economy during the Great Depression and his company has provided employment to many thousands of associates, and has provided billions of quality, affordable products to millions of Americans.

Early years

John L. Blair was apparently driven, in part, by a curiosity of the human mind and its motivations. For several years, Robert Collier, the famous author of early self-help books, worked closely with John Blair in developing sales methods and effective copy writing. Collier wrote that John Blair "seemed to divine naturally what it takes most of us many years to learn, i.e. that regardless of what we have to offer, it is not merchandise that we are selling, but human nature, human reactions."

Robert Collier attributed this faculty in John Blair to an incident which took place when he was just a boy. His mother sent John out to play and the curious lad, seeing a shiny object in a fountain, leaned in to retrieve it, losing his balance. As he caught what might have been his last breath, a passing workman rescued the young boy. Although his life was saved he began to suffer from asthma, which for years threatened his health. Unable to engage in many of the activities of youth, Blair became an avid reader and student of human nature.

Collier also wrote the preface for a book John Blair authored, entitled "The Book of Success."

Born in Warren, Pennsylvania, on Jun 24, 1888, John L. Blair graduated high school there in 1904. He immediately left for the west coast for a year spent exploring the world outside of his small hometown. Shortly after returning home, Blair enrolled in a three-year law degree program at the University of Pennsylvania, located in Philadelphia, PA.

His Company

In 1910, during his second year at the university, John L. Blair received an offer from a classmate to sell raincoats during his Easter vacation trip back home, by train. After making about fifty unsuccessful sales calls, and now just one small community from home, Blair was asked by an undertaker if he had an attractive, professional-looking black raincoat.

He didn't. But an idea struck him, which led to the creation of what is today a multimillion-dollar direct-marketing company, long known as New Process Company, but now known simply as Blair - appropriately named for its founder.

The idea John had was to take advantage of the relatively new process of rubber vulcanization to adhere an attractive black wool fabric to the outside of a rubber raincoat, with an inner lining of a Scottish plaid. His classmate agreed to begin producing just such a coat and supplied him initially with 1200 coats, which were purchased almost immediately. He actually had to send out letters of apology until new coats could be produced. Samples of his letters from as early as 1910 still exist.

With the help of his father and siblings, John mailed 10,000 letters to undertakers across America and the coat quickly saturated the market. He expanded with letters to ministers and businessmen, and he also expanded his product line. For the first few years his business was known as New Process Rubber Company, and by 1916 it was changed to New Process Company. That name remained until 1989, when the board of directors and the first non-family CEO decided the name should be changed to honor the company's founder, John Leo Blair.

Having gone public in 1924, New Process Company, and later Blair Corporation, found its stock to be the oldest continuously-held stock on the American Stock Exchange. By the mid 1980s, New Process was also said to be the largest direct-marketer of clothing and home products in the United States. Murray McComas, CEO at that time, appeared in a filmed interview on the floor of the America Stock Exchange to discuss the unique position New Process Company found itself in, and under McComas the name of this successful, long-standing corporation was changed to Blair.

The Great Depression

However, the going wasn't always easy. In 1927, on some bad advice from Wall Street, New Process Company suffered a disastrous year. In a last-ditch effort, on the very last day of that year, the top six officers pitched in about $100,000 of their own money to stabilize the bottom line.

John Blair was by now a very good friend and law practice client of Robert H. Jackson, a fellow native of Warren County, PA, and a Jamestown, NY lawyer (who in the 1940s would become Attorney General of the U.S., a U.S. Supreme Court Justice and U.S. Chief Prosecutor at the Nuremberg Trial). Jackson introduced him to Franklin D. Roosevelt, whom Jackson had met in Albany, New York, in 1911, when Jackson was a law apprentice. Photos and correspondence document the Blair-Jackson friendship that lasted until Jackson's death in 1954.

John L. Blair continued to pursue his law career while serving as president of his new-found company. It was because of his law career that he met and became good friends with Jackson, and through Jackson, Blair met Franklin D. Roosevelt and Henry Morgenthau, Jr.

Blair provided Roosevelt with ideas during his run for the presidency, based on what John had learned about selling, and human nature, as he built his million-dollar empire. Once Roosevelt was elected, John L. Blair was invited to Washington, DC, to confer with Henry Morgenthau, Jr. on how the nation's economy could be rescued. John Blair and his wife were invited to the White House on at least two occasions to dine with the Roosevelts. The invitations and White House parking passes are held in the company archives, along with letters from Morgenthau.

Morgenthau immediately instituted many of Blair's suggestions and offered him a full-time position at the U.S. Treasury Department. Blair declined the offer as his name had already been used on millions of advertisements by then. He felt it unethical to become a public servant, when already so well known as a direct marketer across America. For instance, at one point, one in every twenty Americans received advertising mailer from New Process Company, all with John L. Blair's handsome face and signature on them.

In 1933, New Process Company suffered a devastating fire. In the middle of a cold November night, John L. Blair climbed a fireman's ladder with axe in hand to break out upper floor windows so that the water from the fire hoses could reach inside. Relying on his strong intestinal fortitude, John Blair had his company up and running again in only ten days. He slowly rebuilt his headquarters based on buildings he had seen while on vacation in Prague, Czechoslovakia.

A Long List of Notable Friends

John loved to travel and he and his wife, Maude Hall Blair, were often joined by Robert Jackson and his wife Irene A. (Gerhardt) Jackson. On one of his many trips overseas, John Blair met then-Monsignor Francis ("Frank") Spellman, a Catholic priest from New York who would one day become arguably America's most famous Cardinal. John L. Blair and Cardinal Spellman also became lifelong friends. It was through Spellman that Blair was able to meet with two leader of the Catholic Church. John L. Blair had an audience with two Popes - Pope Pius XI and Pope Pius XII. The latter Pope knighted Blair and presented him with a very impressive medal, which is still in the family.

John Blair managed to meet and become friends with diplomats and businessmen around the world. He spent many nights on a cruise ship talking with Robert Wood, one-time Vice President of Montgomery Ward, and President of Sears, at the time. A photograph of the two at the captain's table, along with writings by John's wife help tell this story.

Legacy

John L. Blair served as president of his own company for 52 years, until his death in 1962. His son, John L. Blair, Jr., continued that service for the next 25 years until the first non-family CEO was appointed and the name was changed from New Process Company to Blair Corporation.

In 2010, in celebration of 100 years of operation, John Blair's company built a  Blair Museum in his honor, and in honor of the thousands of associates who have served New Process Company and Blair customers for an entire century. Within this museum are held letters from Roosevelt, Morgenthau, Jackson, Merrill, and others, along with legal depositions, letters from John L. Blair, official documents and historical artifacts and archives, all attesting to this notable and important man in American history.

Although it has gone through many changes in recent years, and ownership has returned to private hands, the firm that John L. Blair established one hundred years ago continues to exist through advertisements, catalogs, and a website.

References

American marketing people
1888 births
1962 deaths